Haim Levin (born c. 1937 in Petah Tikva) is a former Israeli football goalkeeper who is most famous for playing in Maccabi Tel Aviv and for Israel in the 1960s.

Honours
Israeli championships
1966–68
State Cup
1963–64, 1964–65, 1966–67
Asian Club Championship
1968–69
Israeli Supercup
1964–65 (shared cup with Hakoah Ramat Gan), 1967–68

References

1937 births
Living people
Israeli Jews
Israeli footballers
Olympic footballers of Israel
Footballers at the 1968 Summer Olympics
1964 AFC Asian Cup players
1968 AFC Asian Cup players
Maccabi Haifa F.C. players
Maccabi Tel Aviv F.C. players
Maccabi Netanya F.C. players
Liga Leumit players
Footballers from Petah Tikva
Israel international footballers
Association football goalkeepers
Israeli Football Hall of Fame inductees
Israeli Footballer of the Year recipients